Teodor D. Costescu (March 15, 1864 – March 25, 1939) was a Romanian educator and politician.

Costescu was born in Rovinari. After graduating from the University of Bucharest with a degree in natural sciences, he became a teacher at Craiova in 1887. He then transferred to Traian High School in Turnu Severin, building up the new institution. He was responsible for several new school buildings in the local Mehedinți County. Costescu served the county as prefect, senator and, from 1912, Conservative-Democratic deputy. In 1934, he was elected an honorary member of the Romanian Academy. He served as a general secretary in the Ministry of Industry.

Notes

1864 births
1939 deaths
People from Gorj County
University of Bucharest alumni
Romanian schoolteachers
Heads of schools in Romania
Honorary members of the Romanian Academy
Prefects of Romania
Members of the Senate of Romania
Members of the Chamber of Deputies (Romania)
Conservative-Democratic Party politicians